Castor oil is a vegetable oil pressed from castor beans.
It is a colourless or pale yellow liquid with a distinct taste and odor. It includes a mixture of triglycerides in which about 90% of fatty acids are ricinoleates. Oleic acid and linoleic acid are the other significant components.

Castor oil and its derivatives are used in the manufacturing of soaps, lubricants, hydraulic and brake fluids, paints, dyes, coatings, inks, cold-resistant plastics, waxes and polishes, nylon, and perfumes.

Etymology
The name probably comes from a confusion between the Ricinus plant that produces it and another plant, the Vitex agnus-castus. An alternative etymology, though, suggests that it was used as a replacement for castoreum.

Composition

Castor oil is well known as a source of ricinoleic acid, a monounsaturated, 18-carbon fatty acid. Among fatty acids, ricinoleic acid is unusual in that it has a hydroxyl functional group on the 12th carbon atom. This functional group causes ricinoleic acid (and castor oil) to be more polar than most fats. The chemical reactivity of the alcohol group also allows chemical derivatization that is not possible with most other seed oils. Because of its ricinoleic acid content, castor oil is a valuable chemical in feedstocks, commanding a higher price than other seed oils. As an example, in July 2007, Indian castor oil sold for about US$0.90/kg ($0.41/lb), whereas U.S. soybean, sunflower, and canola oils sold for about $0.30/kg ($0.14/lb).

Uses
Annually, 270,000–360,000 tonnes (600–800 million pounds) of castor oil are produced for a variety of uses.

Food and preservative
In the food industry, food-grade castor oil is used in food additives, flavorings, candy (e.g., polyglycerol polyricinoleate in chocolate), as a mold inhibitor, and in packaging. Polyoxyethylated castor oil (e.g., Kolliphor EL) is also used in the food industries.

In India, Pakistan, and Nepal, food grains are preserved by the application of castor oil. It stops rice, wheat, and pulses from rotting. For example, the legume pigeon pea is commonly available coated in oil for extended storage.

Traditional medicine 

Use of castor oil as a laxative is attested to in the circa 1550 BCE Ebers Papyrus, and was in use several centuries earlier.

Although used in traditional medicine to induce labor in pregnant women, there is no clinical evidence that castor oil is effective for dilating the cervix or inducing labor.

According to the American Cancer Society, "available scientific evidence does not support claims that castor oil on the skin cures cancer or any other disease."

Emollient 
Castor oil has been used in cosmetic products included in creams and as a moisturizer. It is often combined with zinc oxide  to form an emollient and astringent, zinc and castor oil cream, which is commonly used to treat infants for nappy rash.

Coatings
Castor oil is used as a biobased polyol in the polyurethane industry. The average functionality (number of hydroxyl groups per triglyceride molecule) of castor oil is 2.7, so it is widely used as a rigid polyol and in coatings. One particular use is in a polyurethane concrete where a castor-oil emulsion is reacted with an isocyanate (usually polymeric methylene diphenyl diisocyanate) and a cement and construction aggregate. This is applied fairly thickly as a slurry, which is self-levelling. This base is usually further coated with other systems to build a resilient floor.

Castor oil is not a drying oil, meaning that it has a low reactivity with air compared with oils such as linseed oil and tung oil. Dehydration of castor oil yields linoleic acids, which do have drying properties. In this process, the OH group on the ricinoleic acid along with a hydrogen from the next carbon atom are removed yielding a double bond which then has oxidative cross-linking properties yielding the drying oil.

Precursor to industrial chemicals
Castor oil can react with other materials to produce other chemical compounds that have numerous applications. Transesterification followed by steam cracking gives undecylenic acid, a precursor to specialized polymer nylon 11, and heptanal, a component in fragrances. Breakdown of castor oil in strong base gives 2-octanol, both a fragrance component and a specialized solvent, and the dicarboxylic acid sebacic acid. Hydrogenation of castor oil saturates the alkenes, giving a waxy lubricant. Castor oil may be epoxidized by reacting the OH groups with epichlorohydrin to make the triglycidyl ether of castor oil which is useful in epoxy technology. This is available commercially as Heloxy 505.

The production of lithium grease consumes a significant amount of castor oil. Hydrogenation and saponification of castor oil yields 12-hydroxystearic acid, which is then reacted with lithium hydroxide or lithium carbonate to give high-performance lubricant grease.

Since it has a relatively high dielectric constant (4.7), highly refined and dried castor oil is sometimes used as a dielectric fluid within high-performance, high-voltage capacitors.

Lubrication

Vegetable oils such as castor oil are typically unattractive alternatives to petroleum-derived lubricants because of their poor oxidative stability. Castor oil has better low-temperature viscosity properties and high-temperature lubrication than most vegetable oils, making it useful as a lubricant in jet, diesel, and racing engines. The viscosity of castor oil at 10 °C is 2,420 centipoise, but it tends to form gums in a short time, so its usefulness is limited to engines that are regularly rebuilt, such as racing engines. Lubricant company Castrol took its name from castor oil.

Castor oil has been suggested as a lubricant for bicycle pumps because it does not degrade natural rubber seals.

Early aviation and aeromodelling
 
Castor oil was the preferred lubricant for rotary engines, such as the Gnome engine after that engine's widespread adoption for aviation in Europe in 1909. It was used almost universally in rotary-engined Allied aircraft in World War I. Germany had to make do with inferior ersatz oil for its rotary engines, which resulted in poor reliability.

The methanol-fueled, two-cycle, glow-plug engines used for aeromodelling, since their adoption by model airplane hobbyists in the 1940s, have used varying percentages of castor oil as lubricants. It is highly resistant to degradation when the engine has its fuel-air mixture leaned for maximum engine speed. Gummy residues can still be a problem for aeromodelling powerplants lubricated with castor oil, however, usually requiring eventual replacement of ball bearings when the residue accumulates within the engine's bearing races. One British manufacturer of sleeve-valved four-cycle model engines has stated the "varnish" created by using castor oil in small percentages can improve the pneumatic seal of the sleeve valve, improving such an engine's performance over time.

Turkey red oil
Turkey red oil, also called sulphonated (or sulfated) castor oil, is made by adding sulfuric acid to vegetable oils, most notably castor oil. It was the first synthetic detergent after ordinary soap. It is used in formulating lubricants, softeners, and dyeing assistants.

Biodiesel
Castor oil, like currently less expensive vegetable oils, can be used as feedstock in the production of biodiesel. The resulting fuel is superior for cold winters, because of its exceptionally low cloud point and pour point.

Initiatives to grow more castor for energy production, in preference to other oil crops, are motivated by social considerations. Tropical subsistence farmers would gain a cash crop.

Punishment
Some parents punished children with a dose of castor oil. Physicians recommended against the practice because they did not want medicines associated with punishment.

A heavy dose of castor oil could be used as a humiliating punishment for adults. Colonial officials used it in the British Raj (India) to deal with recalcitrant servants. Belgian military officials prescribed heavy doses of castor oil in Belgian Congo as a punishment for being too sick to work.

The most famous use as punishment came in Fascist Italy under Benito Mussolini. It was a favorite tool used by the Blackshirts to intimidate and humiliate their opponents. Political dissidents were force-fed large quantities of castor oil by Fascist squads. This technique was said to have been originated by Gabriele D'Annunzio or Italo Balbo. Victims of this treatment did sometimes die, as the dehydrating effects of the oil-induced diarrhea often complicated their recovery from the nightstick beatings they also received along with the castor oil; however, even those victims who survived had to bear the humiliation of the laxative effects resulting from excessive consumption of the oil.

Safety
The castor seed contains ricin, a toxic lectin. Heating during the oil extraction process denatures and deactivates the lectin. Harvesting castor beans, though, may not be without risk. The International Castor Oil Association FAQ document states that castor beans contain an allergenic compound called CB1A. This chemical is described as being virtually nontoxic, but has the capacity to affect people with hypersensitivity. The allergen may be neutralized by treatment with a variety of alkaline agents. The allergen is not present in the castor oil itself.

In popular culture
In the 1922 film, Nanook of the North, Nanook gives one of his sons a spoonful of castor oil, and he enjoys it.
In the 1934 Silly Symphony short "The Wise Little Hen", Donald Duck and Peter Pig pretend to have bellyaches to get out of helping the titular hen plant and harvest corn. When she grows wise to their ruse, she invites the two over for dinner and, rather than corn, gives them a bottle of castor oil for their "bellyaches".
In the 1939 film The Great Man Votes, an early scene establishes the loving relationship between the single father played by John Barrymore and his two young children. “Socrates and his hemlock!” Pop declares as he downs the cup of coffee laced with a spoonful of castor oil prepared by his daughter (12-year-old Virginia Weidler), following doctor's orders. 
In the 1943 Tom and Jerry cartoon short "Baby Puss", Tom Cat, dressed as a baby, is given castor oil by a child as a punishment.
In the 1949 MGM Tex Avery cartoon The House of Tomorrow, the house is shown to have individual medicine cabinets for each member of the family, with “Junior’s” containing a large bottle of castor oil and a spoon.
In the novel It Can't Happen Here, castor oil is used by American fascist paramilitaries in a reference to the Mussolini regime.
In the 1986 film Stand by Me, protagonist Gordie tells his friends a story in which castor oil is used to violently disrupt a pie-eating contest.

See also
 Castor wax
 List of unproven and disproven cancer treatments

References

Further reading
  – overview of chemical properties and manufacturing of castor oil

External links

 

Castor oil plant
Ayurvedic medicaments
Laxatives
Non-petroleum based lubricants
Liquid dielectrics
Cosmetics chemicals
Traditional medicine
Triglycerides